The Mid-America version of the NWA World Tag Team Championship was a regional professional wrestling championship for tag teams that was used in the National Wrestling Alliance's (NWA) NWA Mid-America professional wrestling promotion from 1957 until 1977. The championship, promoted by Nick Gulas, was one of many NWA World Tag Team Championships in existence in the period between 1949 and 1992, each of which was a regional championship restricted to an NWA territory and not a true "world" championship. At one point in 1957 there were at least 13 different, concurrently promoted NWA World Tag Team Championships across the United States. The Mid-America version was in use for 20 years, the second longest of any of the NWA World Tag Team Championships of that era, only behind the Central States version. Being a professional wrestling championship, the NWA World Tag Team Championship was not won or lost in competitive matches, but determined by the decision of the bookers of NWA Mid-America.

The Mid-America version was primarily defended in the Tennessee/Alabama territory, occasionally also being defended in surrounding states. The first recognized champions of the Mid-America branch of the championship were the Corsicans (Corsica Joe and Corsica Jean), who were presented as champions on February 5, 1957. Records do not specify if the team won a tournament of if they were simply awarded the championship by promoter Nick Gulas. There were at least 148 championship reigns between 1957 and 1977, when the championship was abandoned, split between 77 different teams and a total of 99 individual wrestlers. Mike Graham and Kevin Sullivan were the last Mid-America-recognized NWA World Tag Team Champions, having won the championship in April 1977, a short time before NWA Mid-America abandoned the championship. At that point the NWA Mid-America Tag Team Championship became the main championship in the territory.

The reign of Len Rossi and Bearcat Brown from October 2, 1969, until some time in May 1970, lasted at least 211 days and possibly as long as 241 days, making it the longest individual reign on record. The Von Brauners (Kurt Von Brauner and Karl Von Brauner) hold the records for most championship reigns, a total of 17 reigns that combined to at least 510 days, probably more. Karl Von Brauner also held the championship with Luke Graham, making his 18 individual championship reigns the most of any wrestler. Due to lack of detail on a multiple championship reigns, it is impossible to determine which team had the shortest reign; the shortest confirmed reign of seven days belonged to Yvon Robert and Billy Wicks, who held the championship from January 5 to January 12, 1959.

Title history

Team reigns by combined length
Key

Individual reigns by combined length
Key

See also
List of NWA Championships

Footnotes

Concurrent championships
Sources for 13 simultaneous NWA World Tag Team Championships
NWA World Tag Team Championship (Los Angeles version)
NWA World Tag Team Championship (San Francisco version)
NWA World Tag Team Championship (Central States version)
NWA World Tag Team Championship (Chicago version)
NWA World Tag Team Championship (Buffalo Athletic Club version)
NWA World Tag Team Championship (Georgia version)
NWA World Tag Team Championship (Iowa/Nebraska version)
NWA World Tag Team Championship (Indianapolis version)
NWA World Tag Team Championship (Salt Lake Wrestling Club version)
NWA World Tag Team Championship (Amarillo version)
NWA World Tag Team Championship (Minneapolis version)
NWA World Tag Team Championship (Texas version)
NWA World Tag Team Championship (Mid-America version)

References
General sources
[G1] – 
[G2] – 

Tag team wrestling championships
National Wrestling Alliance championships
NWA Mid-America championships
World professional wrestling championships